The Central Court Historic District is a historic district and neighborhood of the city of Indianapolis in northern Center Township, Marion County, Indiana, United States.

Central Court was platted in 1916 by Oscar A. Jose and Peter J. Balz, local real estate developers who also created such neighborhoods as Meridian Park to the southwest and the neighborhood lining Fall Creek Parkway between Thirty-eighth and Thirtieth Streets.  They employed a range of architectural styles for the houses in the neighborhood, including American Craftsman, Colonial Revival, Dutch Colonial Revival, and Prairie School.  Many designs were used multiple times in the neighborhood, which has been recognized as one of the area's better examples of early twentieth-century residential architecture.  They built forty-seven houses around the U-shaped Central Court and along Thirty-sixth Street and Central Avenue; seven face Central Avenue, ten face Thirty-sixth Street, and thirty face Central Court.

In 2004, Central Court was designated a historic district and listed on the National Register of Historic Places.  It is by far the smallest historic district in its portion of the city, being dwarfed by areas such as Meridian Park a short distance to the southwest.

References

Historic districts on the National Register of Historic Places in Indiana
Colonial Revival architecture in Indiana
Bungalow architecture in Indiana
Historic districts in Indianapolis
National Register of Historic Places in Indianapolis